Jack Fletcher (6 August 1905 – after 1933) was an English professional footballer who played as an outside forward. He played 12 matches in the Football League.

References

1905 births
Year of death missing
People from Padiham
English footballers
Association football forwards
Colne Town F.C. players
Accrington Stanley F.C. (1891) players
Burnley F.C. players
Nelson F.C. players
Clitheroe F.C. players
Fleetwood Town F.C. players
English Football League players
Association football midfielders